Khemchand Prakash (12 December 1907 – 10 August 1949) was a music composer in the Hindi film industry. He had few peers in 1940s, the decade for Indian film music which started with Saigal very active on the scene and ended with Lata Mangeshkar firmly established in the industry. Lata had fruitful association with him (in films Asha, Ziddi, Mahal) when she started making a name for herself. Many years after Khemchand Prakash's death, the ace composer Kamal Dasgupta rated him the best composer.

Khemchand's brother, Basant Prakash, was also a film composer. Khemchand Prakash had only 1 daughter & her name was Savitri.

Career
Born in Sujangarh, then located in Bikaner State in Rajputana Agency of British India (now in the Churu district of Rajasthan), he got his first training in music and dance from his father, who was a dhrupad singer and a Kathak dancer in the royal court. In his teens, he joined the royal court of Bikaner as a singer and later moved to the royal court of Nepal. But the destiny landed him in Kolkata and he joined the legendary New Theaters. He was assistant to composer Timir Baran in Devdas (1935 film), and he sang a comedy song 'lo kha lo madam khaanaa' (लो खा लो मॅडम खाना) in Street Singer (1938). He then moved to Mumbai and made his debut as music director in 1939 with Supreme Pictures' films Meri Aankhein and Gazi Salauddin, and was soon signed up by Ranjit Movietone Film Studio.

His initial years with Ranjit Movietone produced significant films like Diwali, Holi, Pardesi, Fariyaad, etc. Khursheed was his leading singer and both of them gave many hits of early 40s. His biggest hit with Ranjit Studio was the film Tansen in 1943. Songs like "Diya jalaao jagmag jagmag", "Rumjhum rumjhum chal tihari", "More balpan ke saathi", "Sapt suran teen gram", "Hath sine pe jo rakh do to karara aa jaaye" were big hits. In a radio programme, famous composer Anil Biswas credited Khamchand Prakash for sticking to historical perspective and musical traditions by making K.L. Saigal sing the song 'Sapt Suran Teen Gram' in the Dhrupad style, instead of the Khayal genre, which was done in other films on Tansen, as he knew well that during the life and times of Tansen, the Khayal genre did not exist. 

1948 marked yet another significant film of his career, Bombay Talkies’s Ziddi. He gave first major break to Kishore Kumar as a singer for the song "Marne ki duaaen kyun maangu". Ziddi featured a beautiful song of Lata Mangeshkar "Chanda re ja re ja re".

But what followed Ziddi was another hit film Mahal (1949 film). Mahal made Lata Mangeshkar a popular name. Prior to Mahal, the records used to feature only the character name on the record. Hence the first lot of records had "Aayega aane wala" credited to Kamini. The first time when the song was played on All India Radio many calls were received by AIR to know the singers name. AIR had to in turn ask the record company and announce Lata Mangeshkar's name on air.

Death
Khemchand Prakash died at an early age of 41 on 10 August 1949 due to Cirrhosis.

Kamal Amrohi wrote the opening lines of 'Khaamosh hai zamaana..' while Naqshab completed the rest. The first tune that composer Khemchand Prakash played on the harmonium was approved by Kamal Amrohi. Sadly Khemchand died at the Harikisondas Hospital two months before Mahal released and his creation 'Aayega Aanewala' became a sensation. Javed Akhtar quoted Khemchand Prakash's name in his maiden speech in Rajya Sabha on 17 May 2012 by mentioning that Khemchand Prakash's wife had to beg to be able to survive in her last days.

His grandsons Riju Bajaj (married to Meghna Malik and Aseem Bajaj (married to Leena Yadav), through his daughter Chandrakala Khemchand Prakash and her husband Ram Gopal Bajaj, have both worked as cinematographers in the Indian film industry.

Partial filmography as Composer

 1939 Gazi Salauddin
 1939 Meri Aankhen
 1940 Aaj Ka Hindustan
 1940 Diwali
 1940 Holi
 1940 Pagal
 1941 Bambai Ki Sair
 1941 Pardesi
 1941 Pyaas
 1941 Shaadi
 1942 Fariyaad
 1942 Khilona
 1942 Maheman
 1942 Chandni
 1942 Dukh Sukh
 1943 Chirag
 1943 Gauri
 1943 Kurbani
 1943 Tansen
 1944 Bhartrahari
 1944 Mumtaz Mahal
 1944 Shahenshah Babar
 1945 Dhanna Bhagat
 1945 Prabhu Ka Ghar
 1947 Samaj Ko Badal Dalo
 1947 Sindoor
 1947 Chalte Chalte
 1947 Gaon
 1947 Mera Suhaag
 1948 Asha
 1948 Ziddi
 1949 Mahal
 1949 Rimjhim
 1949 Sawan Aya Re
 1950 Jan Pahchan
 1950 Sati Narmada
 1951 Jai Shankar
 1951 Shri Ganesh Janma
 1952 Tamasha

References

External links
 
 http://members.tripod.com/oldies_club/KCParkash.htm

Indian film score composers
Rajasthani people
1907 births
1950 deaths
20th-century composers
20th-century Indian musicians